Beaujeu may refer to:

Places in France
 Beaujeu, Alpes-de-Haute-Provence, in the Alpes-de-Haute-Provence département
 Beaujeu, Rhône, in the Rhône département
 Beaujeu-Saint-Vallier-Pierrejux-et-Quitteur, in the Haute-Saône département
 Saint-Didier-sur-Beaujeu, in the Rhône département

People

Agnes of Beaujeu (1200–1231), French noblewoman
Guillaume de Beaujeu (died 1291), Grand Master of the Knights Templar
Renaud de Beaujeu (12th–13th century), French author 
Anne of Beaujeu (1461–1522), a French princess and regent for her brother Charles VIII
Daniel Liénard de Beaujeu (1711–1755), French soldier who fought in the Seven Years' War
Jacques-Philippe Saveuse de Beaujeu (died 1832), 19th-century Canadian politician
James de Beaujeu Domville (1933–2015), Canadian theatrical producer and administrator